The Beatles were an English rock band, formed in Liverpool in 1960, that comprised John Lennon, Paul McCartney, George Harrison and Ringo Starr. They are regarded as the most influential band of all time and were integral to the development of 1960s counterculture and popular music's recognition as an art form. Rooted in skiffle, beat and 1950s rock 'n' roll, their sound incorporated elements of classical music and traditional pop in innovative ways; the band also explored music styles ranging from folk and Indian music to psychedelia and hard rock. As pioneers in recording, songwriting and artistic presentation, the Beatles revolutionised many aspects of the music industry and were often publicised as leaders of the era's youth and sociocultural movements.

Led by primary songwriters Lennon and McCartney, the Beatles evolved from Lennon's previous group, the Quarrymen, and built their reputation playing clubs in Liverpool and Hamburg over three years from 1960, initially with Stuart Sutcliffe playing bass. The core trio of Lennon, McCartney and Harrison, together since 1958, went through a succession of drummers, including Pete Best, before asking Starr to join them in 1962. Manager Brian Epstein moulded them into a professional act, and producer George Martin guided and developed their recordings, greatly expanding their domestic success after signing to EMI Records and achieving their first hit, "Love Me Do", in late 1962. As their popularity grew into the intense fan frenzy dubbed "Beatlemania", the band acquired the nickname "the Fab Four", with Epstein, Martin or another member of the band's entourage sometimes informally referred to as a "fifth Beatle".

By early 1964, the Beatles were international stars and had achieved unprecedented levels of critical and commercial success. They became a leading force in Britain's cultural resurgence, ushering in the British Invasion of the United States pop market, and soon made their film debut with A Hard Day's Night (1964). A growing desire to refine their studio efforts, coupled with the untenable nature of their concert tours, led to the band's retirement from live performances in 1966. At this time, they produced records of greater sophistication, including the albums Rubber Soul (1965), Revolver (1966) and Sgt. Pepper's Lonely Hearts Club Band (1967), and enjoyed further commercial success with The Beatles (also known as "the White Album", 1968) and Abbey Road (1969). The success of these records heralded the album era, as albums became the dominant form of record consumption over singles; they also increased public interest in psychedelic drugs and Eastern spirituality, and furthered advancements in electronic music, album art and music videos. In 1968, they founded Apple Corps, a multi-armed multimedia corporation that continues to oversee projects related to the band's legacy. After the group's break-up in 1970, all principal former members enjoyed success as solo artists and some partial reunions have occurred. Lennon was murdered in 1980 and Harrison died of lung cancer in 2001. McCartney and Starr remain musically active.

The Beatles are the best-selling music act of all time, with estimated sales of 600 million units worldwide. They hold the record for most number-one albums on the UK Albums Chart (15), most number-one hits on the US Billboard Hot 100 chart (20), and most singles sold in the UK (21.9 million). The band received many accolades, including seven Grammy Awards, four Brit Awards, an Academy Award (for Best Original Song Score for the 1970 documentary film Let It Be) and fifteen Ivor Novello Awards. They were inducted into the Rock and Roll Hall of Fame in 1988, and each principal member was inducted individually between 1994 and 2015. In 2004 and 2011, the group topped Rolling Stones lists of the greatest artists in history. Time magazine named them among the 20th century's 100 most important people.

History

1956–1963: Formation

The Quarrymen and name changes

In November 1956, sixteen-year-old John Lennon formed a skiffle group with several friends from Quarry Bank High School in Liverpool. They briefly called themselves the Blackjacks, before changing their name to the Quarrymen after discovering that another local group were already using the name. Fifteen-year-old Paul McCartney met Lennon on 6 July 1957, and joined as a rhythm guitarist shortly after. In February 1958, McCartney invited his friend George Harrison, then fifteen, to watch the band. Harrison auditioned for Lennon, impressing him with his playing, but Lennon initially thought Harrison was too young. After a month's persistence, during a second meeting (arranged by McCartney), Harrison performed the lead guitar part of the instrumental song "Raunchy" on the upper deck of a Liverpool bus, and they enlisted him as lead guitarist.

By January 1959, Lennon's Quarry Bank friends had left the group, and he began his studies at the Liverpool College of Art. The three guitarists, billing themselves as Johnny and the Moondogs, were playing rock and roll whenever they could find a drummer. Lennon's art school friend Stuart Sutcliffe, who had just sold one of his paintings and was persuaded to purchase a bass guitar with the proceeds, joined in January 1960. He suggested changing the band's name to Beatals, as a tribute to Buddy Holly and the Crickets. They used this name until May, when they became the Silver Beetles, before undertaking a brief tour of Scotland as the backing group for pop singer and fellow Liverpudlian Johnny Gentle. By early July, they had refashioned themselves as the Silver Beatles, and by the middle of August simply the Beatles.

Early residencies and UK popularity 

Allan Williams, the Beatles' unofficial manager, arranged a residency for them in Hamburg. They auditioned and hired drummer Pete Best in mid-August 1960. The band, now a five-piece, departed Liverpool for Hamburg four days later, contracted to club owner Bruno Koschmider for what would be a -month residency. Beatles historian Mark Lewisohn writes: "They pulled into Hamburg at dusk on 17 August, the time when the red-light area comes to life ... flashing neon lights screamed out the various entertainment on offer, while scantily clad women sat unabashed in shop windows waiting for business opportunities."

Koschmider had converted a couple of strip clubs in the district into music venues, and he initially placed the Beatles at the Indra Club. After closing Indra due to noise complaints, he moved them to the Kaiserkeller in October. When he learned they had been performing at the rival Top Ten Club in breach of their contract, he gave them one month's termination notice, and reported the underage Harrison, who had obtained permission to stay in Hamburg by lying to the German authorities about his age. The authorities arranged for Harrison's deportation in late November. One week later, Koschmider had McCartney and Best arrested for arson after they set fire to a condom in a concrete corridor; the authorities deported them. Lennon returned to Liverpool in early December, while Sutcliffe remained in Hamburg until late February with his German fiancée Astrid Kirchherr, who took the first semi-professional photos of the Beatles.

During the next two years, the Beatles were resident for periods in Hamburg, where they used Preludin both recreationally and to maintain their energy through all-night performances. In 1961, during their second Hamburg engagement, Kirchherr cut Sutcliffe's hair in the "exi" (existentialist) style, later adopted by the other Beatles. Later on, Sutcliffe decided to leave the band early that year and resume his art studies in Germany. McCartney took over bass. Producer Bert Kaempfert contracted what was now a four-piece group until June 1962, and he used them as Tony Sheridan's backing band on a series of recordings for Polydor Records. As part of the sessions, the Beatles were signed to Polydor for one year. Credited to "Tony Sheridan & the Beat Brothers", the single "My Bonnie", recorded in June 1961 and released four months later, reached number 32 on the Musikmarkt chart.

After the Beatles completed their second Hamburg residency, they enjoyed increasing popularity in Liverpool with the growing Merseybeat movement. However, they were growing tired of the monotony of numerous appearances at the same clubs night after night. In November 1961, during one of the group's frequent performances at the Cavern Club, they encountered Brian Epstein, a local record-store owner and music columnist. He later recalled: "I immediately liked what I heard. They were fresh, and they were honest, and they had what I thought was a sort of presence ... [a] star quality."

First EMI recordings
Epstein courted the band over the next couple of months, and they appointed him as their manager in January 1962. Throughout early and mid-1962, Epstein sought to free the Beatles from their contractual obligations to Bert Kaempfert Productions. He eventually negotiated a one-month early release in exchange for one last recording session in Hamburg. On their return to Germany in April, a distraught Kirchherr met them at the airport with news of Sutcliffe's death the previous day from a brain haemorrhage. Epstein began negotiations with record labels for a recording contract. To secure a UK record contract, Epstein negotiated an early end to the band's contract with Polydor, in exchange for more recordings backing Tony Sheridan. After a New Year's Day audition, Decca Records rejected the band, saying, "Guitar groups are on the way out, Mr. Epstein." However, three months later, producer George Martin signed the Beatles to EMI's Parlophone label.

Martin's first recording session with the Beatles took place at EMI Recording Studios (later Abbey Road Studios) in London on 6 June 1962. He immediately complained to Epstein about Best's drumming and suggested they use a session drummer in his place. Already contemplating Best's dismissal, the Beatles replaced him in mid-August with Ringo Starr, who left Rory Storm and the Hurricanes to join them. A 4 September session at EMI yielded a recording of "Love Me Do" featuring Starr on drums, but a dissatisfied Martin hired drummer Andy White for the band's third session a week later, which produced recordings of "Love Me Do", "Please Please Me" and "P.S. I Love You".

Martin initially selected the Starr version of "Love Me Do" for the band's first single, though subsequent re-pressings featured the White version, with Starr on tambourine. Released in early October, "Love Me Do" peaked at number seventeen on the Record Retailer chart. Their television debut came later that month with a live performance on the regional news programme People and Places. After Martin suggested rerecording "Please Please Me" at a faster tempo, a studio session in late November yielded that recording, of which Martin accurately predicted, "You've just made your first No. 1."

In December 1962, the Beatles concluded their fifth and final Hamburg residency. By 1963, they had agreed that all four band members would contribute vocals to their albums – including Starr, despite his restricted vocal range, to validate his standing in the group. Lennon and McCartney had established a songwriting partnership, and as the band's success grew, their dominant collaboration limited Harrison's opportunities as a lead vocalist. Epstein, to maximise the Beatles' commercial potential, encouraged them to adopt a professional approach to performing. Lennon recalled him saying, "Look, if you really want to get in these bigger places, you're going to have to change – stop eating on stage, stop swearing, stop smoking ...."

1963–1966: Beatlemania and touring years

Please Please Me and With the Beatles 

On 11 February 1963, the Beatles recorded ten songs during a single studio session for their debut LP, Please Please Me. It was supplemented by the four tracks already released on their first two singles. Martin considered recording the LP live at The Cavern Club, but after deciding that the building's acoustics were inadequate, he elected to simulate a "live" album with minimal production in "a single marathon session at Abbey Road". After the moderate success of "Love Me Do", the single "Please Please Me" was released in January 1963, two months ahead of the album. It reached number one on every UK chart except Record Retailer, where it peaked at number two.

Recalling how the Beatles "rushed to deliver a debut album, bashing out Please Please Me in a day", AllMusic critic Stephen Thomas Erlewine wrote: "Decades after its release, the album still sounds fresh, precisely because of its intense origins." Lennon said little thought went into composition at the time; he and McCartney were "just writing songs à la Everly Brothers, à la Buddy Holly, pop songs with no more thought of them than that – to create a sound. And the words were almost irrelevant."

Released in March 1963, Please Please Me was the first of eleven consecutive Beatles albums released in the United Kingdom to reach number one. The band's third single, "From Me to You", came out in April and began an almost unbroken string of seventeen British number-one singles, including all but one of the eighteen they released over the next six years. Issued in August, their fourth single, "She Loves You", achieved the fastest sales of any record in the UK up to that time, selling three-quarters of a million copies in under four weeks. It became their first single to sell a million copies, and remained the biggest-selling record in the UK until 1978.

The success brought increased media exposure, to which the Beatles responded with an irreverent and comical attitude that defied the expectations of pop musicians at the time, inspiring even more interest. The band toured the UK three times in the first half of the year: a four-week tour that began in February, the Beatles' first nationwide, preceded three-week tours in March and May–June. As their popularity spread, a frenzied adulation of the group took hold. On 13 October, the Beatles starred on Sunday Night at the London Palladium, the UK's top variety show. Their performance was televised live and watched by 15 million viewers. One national paper's headlines in the following days coined the term "Beatlemania" to describe the riotous enthusiasm by screaming fans who greeted the band – and it stuck. Although not billed as tour leaders, the Beatles overshadowed American acts Tommy Roe and Chris Montez during the February engagements and assumed top billing "by audience demand", something no British act had previously accomplished while touring with artists from the US. A similar situation arose during their May–June tour with Roy Orbison.

In late October, the Beatles began a five-day tour of Sweden, their first time abroad since the final Hamburg engagement of December 1962. On their return to the UK on 31 October, several hundred screaming fans greeted them in heavy rain at Heathrow Airport. Around 50 to 100 journalists and photographers, as well as representatives from the BBC, also joined the airport reception, the first of more than 100 such events. The next day, the band began its fourth tour of Britain within nine months, this one scheduled for six weeks. In mid-November, as Beatlemania intensified, police resorted to using high-pressure water hoses to control the crowd before a concert in Plymouth.

Please Please Me maintained the top position on the Record Retailer chart for 30 weeks, only to be displaced by its follow-up, With the Beatles, which EMI released on 22 November to record advance orders of 270,000 copies. The LP topped a half-million albums sold in one week. Recorded between July and October, With the Beatles made better use of studio production techniques than its predecessor. It held the top spot for 21 weeks with a chart life of 40 weeks. Erlewine described the LP as "a sequel of the highest order – one that betters the original".

In a reversal of then standard practice, EMI released the album ahead of the impending single "I Want to Hold Your Hand", with the song excluded to maximise the single's sales. The album caught the attention of music critic William Mann of The Times, who suggested that Lennon and McCartney were "the outstanding English composers of 1963". The newspaper published a series of articles in which Mann offered detailed analyses of the music, lending it respectability. With the Beatles became the second album in UK chart history to sell a million copies, a figure previously reached only by the 1958 South Pacific soundtrack. When writing the sleeve notes for the album, the band's press officer, Tony Barrow, used the superlative the "fabulous foursome", which the media widely adopted as "the Fab Four".

First visit to the United States and the British Invasion 

EMI's American subsidiary, Capitol Records, hindered the Beatles' releases in the United States for more than a year by initially declining to issue their music, including their first three singles. Concurrent negotiations with the independent US label Vee-Jay led to the release of some, but not all, of the songs in 1963. Vee-Jay finished preparation for the album Introducing... The Beatles, comprising most of the songs of Parlophone's Please Please Me, but a management shake-up led to the album not being released. After it emerged that the label did not report royalties on their sales, the licence that Vee-Jay had signed with EMI was voided. A new licence was granted to the Swan label for the single "She Loves You". The record received some airplay in the Tidewater area of Virginia from Gene Loving of radio station WGH and was featured on the "Rate-a-Record" segment of American Bandstand, but it failed to catch on nationally.

Epstein brought a demo copy of "I Want to Hold Your Hand" to Capitol's Brown Meggs, who signed the band and arranged for a $40,000 US marketing campaign. American chart success began after disc jockey Carroll James of AM radio station WWDC, in Washington, DC, obtained a copy of the British single "I Want to Hold Your Hand" in mid-December 1963 and began playing it on-air. Taped copies of the song soon circulated among other radio stations throughout the US. This caused an increase in demand, leading Capitol to bring forward the release of "I Want to Hold Your Hand" by three weeks. Issued on 26 December, with the band's previously scheduled debut there just weeks away, "I Want to Hold Your Hand" sold a million copies, becoming a number-one hit in the US by mid-January. In its wake Vee-Jay released Introducing... The Beatles along with Capitol's debut album, Meet the Beatles!, while Swan reactivated production of "She Loves You".

On 7 February 1964, the Beatles departed from Heathrow with an estimated 4,000 fans waving and screaming as the aircraft took off. Upon landing at New York's John F. Kennedy Airport, an uproarious crowd estimated at 3,000 greeted them. They gave their first live US television performance two days later on The Ed Sullivan Show, watched by approximately 73 million viewers in over 23 million households, or 34 per cent of the American population. Biographer Jonathan Gould writes that, according to the Nielsen rating service, it was "the largest audience that had ever been recorded for an American television ". The next morning, the Beatles awoke to a largely negative critical consensus in the US, but a day later at their first US concert, Beatlemania erupted at the Washington Coliseum. Back in New York the following day, the Beatles met with another strong reception during two shows at Carnegie Hall. The band flew to Florida, where they appeared on The Ed Sullivan Show a second time, again before 70 million viewers, before returning to the UK on 22 February.

The Beatles' first visit to the US took place when the nation was still mourning the assassination of President John F. Kennedy the previous November. Commentators often suggest that for many, particularly the young, the Beatles' performances reignited the sense of excitement and possibility that momentarily faded in the wake of the assassination, and helped pave the way for the revolutionary social changes to come later in the decade. Their hairstyle, unusually long for the era and mocked by many adults, became an emblem of rebellion to the burgeoning youth culture.

The group's popularity generated unprecedented interest in British music, and many other UK acts subsequently made their American debuts, successfully touring over the next three years in what was termed the British Invasion. The Beatles' success in the US opened the door for a successive string of British beat groups and pop acts such as the Dave Clark Five, the Animals, Petula Clark, the Kinks, and the Rolling Stones to achieve success in America. During the week of 4 April 1964, the Beatles held twelve positions on the Billboard Hot 100 singles chart, including the top five.

A Hard Day's Night 

Capitol Records' lack of interest throughout 1963 did not go unnoticed, and a competitor, United Artists Records, encouraged its film division to offer the Beatles a three-motion-picture deal, primarily for the commercial potential of the soundtracks in the US. Directed by Richard Lester, A Hard Day's Night involved the band for six weeks in March–April 1964 as they played themselves in a musical comedy. The film premiered in London and New York in July and August, respectively, and was an international success, with some critics drawing a comparison with the Marx Brothers.

United Artists released a full soundtrack album for the North American market, combining Beatles songs and Martin's orchestral score; elsewhere, the group's third studio LP, A Hard Day's Night, contained songs from the film on side one and other new recordings on side two. According to Erlewine, the album saw them "truly coming into their own as a band. All of the disparate influences on their first two albums coalesced into a bright, joyous, original sound, filled with ringing guitars and irresistible melodies." That "ringing guitar" sound was primarily the product of Harrison's 12-string electric Rickenbacker, a prototype given to him by the manufacturer, which made its debut on the record.

1964 world tour, meeting Bob Dylan, and stand on civil rights

Touring internationally in June and July, the Beatles staged 37 shows over 27 days in Denmark, the Netherlands, Hong Kong, Australia and New Zealand. In August and September, they returned to the US, with a 30-concert tour of 23 cities. Generating intense interest once again, the month-long tour attracted between 10,000 and 20,000 fans to each 30-minute performance in cities from San Francisco to New York.

In August, journalist Al Aronowitz arranged for the Beatles to meet Bob Dylan. Visiting the band in their New York hotel suite, Dylan introduced them to cannabis. Gould points out the musical and cultural significance of this meeting, before which the musicians' respective fanbases were "perceived as inhabiting two separate subcultural worlds": Dylan's audience of "college kids with artistic or intellectual leanings, a dawning political and social idealism, and a mildly bohemian style" contrasted with their fans, "veritable 'teenyboppers' – kids in high school or grade school whose lives were totally wrapped up in the commercialised popular culture of television, radio, pop records, fan magazines, and teen fashion. To many of Dylan's followers in the folk music scene, the Beatles were seen as idolaters, not idealists."

Within six months of the meeting, according to Gould, "Lennon would be making records on which he openly imitated Dylan's nasal drone, brittle strum, and introspective vocal persona"; and six months after that, Dylan began performing with a backing band and electric instrumentation, and "dressed in the height of Mod fashion". As a result, Gould continues, the traditional division between folk and rock enthusiasts "nearly evaporated", as the Beatles' fans began to mature in their outlook and Dylan's audience embraced the new, youth-driven pop culture.

During the 1964 US tour, the group were confronted with racial segregation in the country at the time. When informed that the venue for their 11 September concert, the Gator Bowl in Jacksonville, Florida, was segregated, the Beatles said they would refuse to perform unless the audience was integrated. Lennon stated: "We never play to segregated audiences and we aren't going to start now ... I'd sooner lose our appearance money." City officials relented and agreed to allow an integrated show. The group also cancelled their reservations at the whites-only Hotel George Washington in Jacksonville. For their subsequent US tours in 1965 and 1966, the Beatles included clauses in contracts stipulating that shows be integrated.

Beatles for Sale, Help! and Rubber Soul 
According to Gould, the Beatles' fourth studio LP, Beatles for Sale, evidenced a growing conflict between the commercial pressures of their global success and their creative ambitions. They had intended the album, recorded between August and October 1964, to continue the format established by A Hard Day's Night which, unlike their first two LPs, contained only original songs. They had nearly exhausted their backlog of songs on the previous album, however, and given the challenges constant international touring posed to their songwriting efforts, Lennon admitted, "Material's becoming a hell of a problem". As a result, six covers from their extensive repertoire were chosen to complete the album. Released in early December, its eight original compositions stood out, demonstrating the growing maturity of the Lennon–McCartney songwriting partnership.

In early 1965, following a dinner with Lennon, Harrison and their wives, Harrison's dentist, John Riley, secretly added LSD to their coffee. Lennon described the experience: "It was just terrifying, but it was fantastic. I was pretty stunned for a month or two." He and Harrison subsequently became regular users of the drug, joined by Starr on at least one occasion. Harrison's use of psychedelic drugs encouraged his path to meditation and Hinduism. He commented: "For me, it was like a flash. The first time I had acid, it just opened up something in my head that was inside of me, and I realised a lot of things. I didn't learn them because I already knew them, but that happened to be the key that opened the door to reveal them. From the moment I had that, I wanted to have it all the time – these thoughts about the yogis and the Himalayas, and Ravi's music." McCartney was initially reluctant to try it, but eventually did so in late 1966. He became the first Beatle to discuss LSD publicly, declaring in a magazine interview that "it opened my eyes" and "made me a better, more honest, more tolerant member of society".

Controversy erupted in June 1965 when Queen Elizabeth II appointed all four Beatles Members of the Order of the British Empire (MBE) after Prime Minister Harold Wilson nominated them for the award. In protest – the honour was at that time primarily bestowed upon military veterans and civic leaders – some conservative MBE recipients returned their insignia.

In July, the Beatles' second film, Help!, was released, again directed by Lester. Described as "mainly a relentless spoof of Bond", it inspired a mixed response among both reviewers and the band. McCartney said: "Help! was great but it wasn't our film – we were sort of guest stars. It was fun, but basically, as an idea for a film, it was a bit wrong." The soundtrack was dominated by Lennon, who wrote and sang lead on most of its songs, including the two singles: "Help!" and "Ticket to Ride".

The Help! album, the group's fifth studio LP, mirrored A Hard Day's Night by featuring soundtrack songs on side one and additional songs from the same sessions on side two. The LP contained all original material save for two covers, "Act Naturally" and "Dizzy Miss Lizzy"; they were the last covers the band would include on an album, except for Let It Be brief rendition of the traditional Liverpool folk song "Maggie Mae". The band expanded their use of vocal overdubs on Help! and incorporated classical instruments into some arrangements, including a string quartet on the pop ballad "Yesterday". Composed by and sung by McCartney – none of the other Beatles perform on the recording – "Yesterday" has inspired the most cover versions of any song ever written. With Help!, the Beatles became the first rock group to be nominated for a Grammy Award for Album of the Year.

The group's third US tour opened with a performance before a world-record crowd of 55,600 at New York's Shea Stadium on 15 August – "perhaps the most famous of all Beatles' concerts", in Lewisohn's description. A further nine successful concerts followed in other American cities. At a show in Atlanta, the Beatles gave one of the first live performances ever to make use of a foldback system of on-stage monitor speakers. Towards the end of the tour, they met with Elvis Presley, a foundational musical influence on the band, who invited them to his home in Beverly Hills.

September 1965 saw the launch of an American Saturday-morning cartoon series, The Beatles, that echoed A Hard Day's Night slapstick antics over its two-year original run. The series was a historical milestone as the first weekly television series to feature animated versions of real, living people.

In mid-October, the Beatles entered the recording studio; for the first time when making an album, they had an extended period without other major commitments. Until this time, according to George Martin, "we had been making albums rather like a collection of singles. Now we were really beginning to think about albums as a bit of art on their own." Released in December, Rubber Soul was hailed by critics as a major step forward in the maturity and complexity of the band's music. Their thematic reach was beginning to expand as they embraced deeper aspects of romance and philosophy, a development that NEMS executive Peter Brown attributed to the band members' "now habitual use of marijuana". Lennon referred to Rubber Soul as "the pot album" and Starr said: "Grass was really influential in a lot of our changes, especially with the writers. And because they were writing different material, we were playing differently." After Help!s foray into classical music with flutes and strings, Harrison's introduction of a sitar on "Norwegian Wood (This Bird Has Flown)" marked a further progression outside the traditional boundaries of popular music. As the lyrics grew more artful, fans began to study them for deeper meaning.

While some of Rubber Souls songs were the product of Lennon and McCartney's collaborative songwriting, the album also included distinct compositions from each, though they continued to share official credit. "In My Life", of which each later claimed lead authorship, is considered a highlight of the entire Lennon–McCartney catalogue. Harrison called Rubber Soul his "favourite album", and Starr referred to it as "the departure record". McCartney has said, "We'd had our cute period, and now it was time to expand." However, recording engineer Norman Smith later stated that the studio sessions revealed signs of growing conflict within the group – "the clash between John and Paul was becoming obvious", he wrote, and "as far as Paul was concerned, George could do no right". In 2003, Rolling Stone ranked Rubber Soul fifth among "The 500 Greatest Albums of All Time", and AllMusic's Richie Unterberger describes it as "one of the classic folk-rock records".

Controversies, Revolver and final tour
Capitol Records, from December 1963 when it began issuing Beatles recordings for the US market, exercised complete control over format, compiling distinct US albums from the band's recordings and issuing songs of their choosing as singles. In June 1966, the Capitol LP Yesterday and Today caused an uproar with its cover, which portrayed the grinning Beatles dressed in butcher's overalls, accompanied by raw meat and mutilated plastic baby dolls. According to Beatles biographer Bill Harry, it has been incorrectly suggested that this was meant as a satirical response to the way Capitol had "butchered" the US versions of the band's albums. Thousands of copies of the LP had a new cover pasted over the original; an unpeeled "first-state" copy fetched $10,500 at a December 2005 auction. In England, meanwhile, Harrison met sitar maestro Ravi Shankar, who agreed to train him on the instrument.

During a tour of the Philippines the month after the Yesterday and Today furore, the Beatles unintentionally snubbed the nation's first lady, Imelda Marcos, who had expected them to attend a breakfast reception at the Presidential Palace. When presented with the invitation, Epstein politely declined on the band members' behalf, as it had never been his policy to accept such official invitations. They soon found that the Marcos regime was unaccustomed to taking no for an answer. The resulting riots endangered the group and they escaped the country with difficulty. Immediately afterwards, the band members visited India for the first time.

Almost as soon as they returned home, the Beatles faced a fierce backlash from US religious and social conservatives (as well as the Ku Klux Klan) over a comment Lennon had made in a March interview with British reporter Maureen Cleave. "Christianity will go", Lennon had said. "It will vanish and shrink. I needn't argue about that; I'm right and I will be proved right ... Jesus was alright but his disciples were thick and ordinary. It's them twisting it that ruins it for me." His comments went virtually unnoticed in England, but when US teenage fan magazine Datebook printed them five months later, it sparked a controversy with Christians in America's conservative Bible Belt region. The Vatican issued a protest, and bans on Beatles' records were imposed by Spanish and Dutch stations and South Africa's national broadcasting service. Epstein accused Datebook of having taken Lennon's words out of context. At a press conference, Lennon pointed out, "If I'd said television was more popular than Jesus, I might have got away with it." He claimed that he was referring to how other people viewed their success, but at the prompting of reporters, he concluded: "If you want me to apologise, if that will make you happy, then okay, I'm sorry."

Released in August 1966, a week before the Beatles' final tour, Revolver marked another artistic step forward for the group. The album featured sophisticated songwriting, studio experimentation, and a greatly expanded repertoire of musical styles, ranging from innovative classical string arrangements to psychedelia. Abandoning the customary group photograph, its Aubrey Beardsley-inspired cover – designed by Klaus Voormann, a friend of the band since their Hamburg days – was a monochrome collage and line drawing caricature of the group. The album was preceded by the single "Paperback Writer", backed by "Rain". Short promotional films were made for both songs; described by cultural historian Saul Austerlitz as "among the first true music videos", they aired on The Ed Sullivan Show and Top of the Pops in June.

Among the experimental songs on Revolver was "Tomorrow Never Knows", the lyrics for which Lennon drew from Timothy Leary's The Psychedelic Experience: A Manual Based on the Tibetan Book of the Dead. Its creation involved eight tape decks distributed about the EMI building, each staffed by an engineer or band member, who randomly varied the movement of a tape loop while Martin created a composite recording by sampling the incoming data. McCartney's "Eleanor Rigby" made prominent use of a string octet; Gould describes it as "a true hybrid, conforming to no recognisable style or genre of song". Harrison's emergence as a songwriter was reflected in three of his compositions appearing on the record. Among these, "Taxman", which opened the album, marked the first example of the Beatles making a political statement through their music. In 2020, Rolling Stone ranked Revolver at #11 on their list of "The 500 Greatest Albums of All Time".

As preparations were made for a tour of the US, the Beatles knew that their music would hardly be heard. Having originally used Vox AC30 amplifiers, they later acquired more powerful 100-watt amplifiers, specially designed for them by Vox, as they moved into larger venues in 1964; however, these were still inadequate. Struggling to compete with the volume of sound generated by screaming fans, the band had grown increasingly bored with the routine of performing live. Recognising that their shows were no longer about the music, they decided to make the August tour their last.

The band performed none of their new songs on the tour. In Chris Ingham's description, they were very much "studio creations ... and there was no way a four-piece rock 'n' roll group could do them justice, particularly through the desensitising wall of the fans' screams. 'Live Beatles' and 'Studio Beatles' had become entirely different beasts." The band's concert at San Francisco's Candlestick Park on 29 August was their last commercial concert. It marked the end of four years dominated by almost non-stop touring that included over 1,400 concert appearances internationally.

1966–1970: Studio years

Sgt. Pepper's Lonely Hearts Club Band

Freed from the burden of touring, the Beatles embraced an increasingly experimental approach as they recorded Sgt. Pepper's Lonely Hearts Club Band, beginning in late November 1966. According to engineer Geoff Emerick, the album's recording took over 700 hours. He recalled the band's insistence "that everything on Sgt. Pepper had to be different. We had microphones right down in the bells of brass instruments and headphones turned into microphones attached to violins. We used giant primitive oscillators to vary the speed of instruments and vocals and we had tapes chopped to pieces and stuck together upside down and the wrong way around." Parts of "A Day in the Life" featured a 40-piece orchestra. The sessions initially yielded the non-album double A-side single "Strawberry Fields Forever"/"Penny Lane" in February 1967; the Sgt. Pepper LP followed with a rush-release in May. The musical complexity of the records, created using relatively primitive four-track recording technology, astounded contemporary artists. Among music critics, acclaim for the album was virtually universal. Gould writes:

In the wake of Sgt. Pepper, the underground and mainstream press widely publicised the Beatles as leaders of youth culture, as well as "lifestyle revolutionaries". The album was the first major pop/rock LP to include its complete lyrics, which appeared on the back cover. Those lyrics were the subject of critical analysis; for instance, in late 1967 the album was the subject of a scholarly inquiry by American literary critic and professor of English Richard Poirier, who observed that his students were "listening to the group's music with a degree of engagement that he, as a teacher of literature, could only envy". The elaborate cover also attracted considerable interest and study. A collage designed by pop artists Peter Blake and Jann Haworth, it depicted the group as the fictional band referred to in the album's title track standing in front of a crowd of famous people. The heavy moustaches worn by the group reflected the growing influence of hippie style, while cultural historian Jonathan Harris describes their "brightly coloured parodies of military uniforms" as a knowingly "anti-authoritarian and anti-establishment" display.

Sgt. Pepper topped the UK charts for 23 consecutive weeks, with a further four weeks at number one in the period through to February 1968. With 2.5 million copies sold within three months of its release, Sgt. Peppers initial commercial success exceeded that of all previous Beatles albums. It sustained its immense popularity into the 21st century while breaking numerous sales records. In 2003, Rolling Stone ranked Sgt. Pepper at number one on its list of the greatest albums of all time.

Magical Mystery Tour and Yellow Submarine

Two Beatles film projects were conceived within weeks of completing Sgt. Pepper: Magical Mystery Tour, a one-hour television film, and Yellow Submarine, an animated feature-length film produced by United Artists. The group began recording music for the former in late April 1967, but the project then lay dormant as they focused on recording songs for the latter. On 25 June, the Beatles performed their forthcoming single "All You Need Is Love" to an estimated 350 million viewers on Our World, the first live global television link. Released a week later, during the Summer of Love, the song was adopted as a flower power anthem. The Beatles' use of psychedelic drugs was at its height during that summer. In July and August, the group pursued interests related to similar utopian-based ideology, including a week-long investigation into the possibility of starting an island-based commune off the coast of Greece.

On 24 August, the group were introduced to Maharishi Mahesh Yogi in London. The next day, they travelled to Bangor for his Transcendental Meditation retreat. On 27 August, their manager's assistant, Peter Brown, phoned to inform them that Epstein had died. The coroner ruled the death an accidental carbitol overdose, although it was widely rumoured to be a suicide. His death left the group disoriented and fearful about the future. Lennon recalled: "We collapsed. I knew that we were in trouble then. I didn't really have any misconceptions about our ability to do anything other than play music, and I was scared. I thought, 'We've fuckin' had it now. Harrison's then-wife Pattie Boyd remembered that "Paul and George were in complete shock. I don't think it could have been worse if they had heard that their own fathers had dropped dead." During a band meeting in September, McCartney recommended that the band proceed with Magical Mystery Tour.

The Magical Mystery Tour soundtrack was released in the UK as a six-track double extended play (EP) in early December 1967. It was the first example of a double EP in the UK. The record carried on the psychedelic vein of Sgt. Pepper, however, in line with the band's wishes, the packaging reinforced the idea that the release was a film soundtrack rather than a follow-up to Sgt. Pepper. In the US, the soundtrack appeared as an identically titled LP that also included five tracks from the band's recent singles. In its first three weeks, the album set a record for the highest initial sales of any Capitol LP, and it is the only Capitol compilation later to be adopted in the band's official canon of studio albums.

Magical Mystery Tour first aired on Boxing Day to an audience of approximately 15 million. Largely directed by McCartney, the film was the band's first critical failure in the UK. It was dismissed as "blatant rubbish" by the Daily Express; the Daily Mail called it "a colossal conceit"; and The Guardian labelled the film "a kind of fantasy morality play about the grossness and warmth and stupidity of the audience". Gould describes it as "a great deal of raw footage showing a group of people getting on, getting off, and riding on a bus". Although the viewership figures were respectable, its slating in the press led US television networks to lose interest in broadcasting the film.

The group were less involved with Yellow Submarine, which featured the band appearing as themselves for only a short live-action segment. Premiering in July 1968, the film featured cartoon versions of the band members and a soundtrack with eleven of their songs, including four unreleased studio recordings that made their debut in the film. Critics praised the film for its music, humour and innovative visual style. A soundtrack LP was issued seven months later; it contained those four new songs, the title track (already issued on Revolver), "All You Need Is Love" (already issued as a single and on the US Magical Mystery Tour LP) and seven instrumental pieces composed by Martin.

India retreat, Apple Corps and the White Album

In February 1968, the Beatles travelled to Maharishi Mahesh Yogi's ashram in Rishikesh, India, to take part in a three-month meditation "Guide Course". Their time in India marked one of the band's most prolific periods, yielding numerous songs, including a majority of those on their next album. However, Starr left after only ten days, unable to stomach the food, and McCartney eventually grew bored and departed a month later. For Lennon and Harrison, creativity turned to question when an electronics technician known as Magic Alex suggested that the Maharishi was attempting to manipulate them. When he alleged that the Maharishi had made sexual advances to women attendees, a persuaded Lennon left abruptly just two months into the course, bringing an unconvinced Harrison and the remainder of the group's entourage with him. In anger, Lennon wrote a scathing song titled "Maharishi", renamed "Sexy Sadie" to avoid potential legal issues. McCartney said, "We made a mistake. We thought there was more to him than there was."

In May, Lennon and McCartney travelled to New York for the public unveiling of the Beatles' new business venture, Apple Corps. It was initially formed several months earlier as part of a plan to create a tax-effective business structure, but the band then desired to extend the corporation to other pursuits, including record distribution, peace activism, and education. McCartney described Apple as "rather like a Western communism". The enterprise drained the group financially with a series of unsuccessful projects handled largely by members of the Beatles' entourage, who were given their jobs regardless of talent and experience. Among its numerous subsidiaries were Apple Electronics, established to foster technological innovations with Magic Alex at the head, and Apple Retailing, which opened the short-lived Apple Boutique in London. Harrison later said, "Basically, it was chaos ... John and Paul got carried away with the idea and blew millions, and Ringo and I just had to go along with it."

From late May to mid-October 1968, the group recorded what became The Beatles, a double LP commonly known as "the White Album" for its virtually featureless cover. During this time, relations between the members grew openly divisive. Starr quit for two weeks, leaving his bandmates to record "Back in the U.S.S.R." and "Dear Prudence" as a trio, with McCartney filling in on drums. Lennon had lost interest in collaborating with McCartney, whose contribution "Ob-La-Di, Ob-La-Da" he scorned as "granny music shit". Tensions were further aggravated by Lennon's romantic preoccupation with avant-garde artist Yoko Ono, whom he insisted on bringing to the sessions despite the group's well-established understanding that girlfriends were not allowed in the studio. McCartney has recalled that the album "wasn't a pleasant one to make". He and Lennon identified the sessions as the start of the band's break-up.

With the record, the band executed a wider range of musical styles and broke with their recent tradition of incorporating several musical styles in one song by keeping each piece of music consistently faithful to a select genre. During the sessions, the group upgraded to an eight-track tape console, which made it easier for them to layer tracks piecemeal, while the members often recorded independently of each other, affording the album a reputation as a collection of solo recordings rather than a unified group effort. Describing the double album, Lennon later said: "Every track is an individual track; there isn't any Beatle music on it. [It's] John and the band, Paul and the band, George and the band." The sessions also produced the Beatles' longest song yet, "Hey Jude", released in August as a non-album single with "Revolution".

Issued in November, the White Album was the band's first Apple Records album release, although EMI continued to own their recordings. The record attracted more than 2 million advance orders, selling nearly 4 million copies in the US in little over a month, and its tracks dominated the playlists of American radio stations. Its lyric content was the focus of much analysis by the counterculture. Despite its popularity, reviewers were largely confused by the album's content, and it failed to inspire the level of critical writing that Sgt. Pepper had. General critical opinion eventually turned in favour of the White Album, and in 2003, Rolling Stone ranked it as the tenth greatest album of all time.

Abbey Road, Let It Be and separation 

Although Let It Be was the Beatles' final album release, it was largely recorded before Abbey Road. The project's impetus came from an idea Martin attributes to McCartney, who suggested they "record an album of new material and rehearse it, then perform it before a live audience for the very first time – on record and on film". Originally intended for a one-hour television programme to be called Beatles at Work, in the event much of the album's content came from studio work beginning in January 1969, many hours of which were captured on film by director Michael Lindsay-Hogg. Martin said that the project was "not at all a happy recording experience. It was a time when relations between the Beatles were at their lowest ebb." Lennon described the largely impromptu sessions as "hell ... the most miserable ... on Earth", and Harrison, "the low of all-time". Irritated by McCartney and Lennon, Harrison walked out for five days. Upon returning, he threatened to leave the band unless they "abandon[ed] all talk of live performance" and instead focused on finishing a new album, initially titled Get Back, using songs recorded for the TV special. He also demanded they cease work at Twickenham Film Studios, where the sessions had begun, and relocate to the newly finished Apple Studio. His bandmates agreed, and it was decided to salvage the footage shot for the TV production for use in a feature film.

To alleviate tensions within the band and improve the quality of their live sound, Harrison invited keyboardist Billy Preston to participate in the last nine days of sessions. Preston received label billing on the "Get Back" single – the only musician ever to receive that acknowledgment on an official Beatles release. After the rehearsals, the band could not agree on a location to film a concert, rejecting several ideas, including a boat at sea, a lunatic asylum, the Libyan desert, and the Colosseum. Ultimately, what would be their final live performance was filmed on the rooftop of the Apple Corps building at 3 Savile Row, London, on 30 January 1969. Five weeks later, engineer Glyn Johns, whom Lewisohn describes as Get Backs "uncredited producer", began work assembling an album, given "free rein" as the band "all but washed their hands of the entire project".

New strains developed between the band members regarding the appointment of a financial adviser, the need for which had become evident without Epstein to manage business affairs. Lennon, Harrison and Starr favoured Allen Klein, who had managed the Rolling Stones and Sam Cooke; McCartney wanted Lee and John Eastman – father and brother, respectively, of Linda Eastman, whom McCartney married on 12 March. Agreement could not be reached, so both Klein and the Eastmans were temporarily appointed: Klein as the Beatles' business manager and the Eastmans as their lawyers. Further conflict ensued, however, and financial opportunities were lost. On 8 May, Klein was named sole manager of the band, the Eastmans having previously been dismissed as the Beatles' lawyers. McCartney refused to sign the management contract with Klein, but he was out-voted by the other Beatles.

Martin stated that he was surprised when McCartney asked him to produce another album, as the Get Back sessions had been "a miserable experience" and he had "thought it was the end of the road for all of us". The primary recording sessions for Abbey Road began on 2 July. Lennon, who rejected Martin's proposed format of a "continuously moving piece of music", wanted his and McCartney's songs to occupy separate sides of the album. The eventual format, with individually composed songs on the first side and the second consisting largely of a medley, was McCartney's suggested compromise. Emerick noted that the replacement of the studio's valve mixing console with a transistorised one yielded a less punchy sound, leaving the group frustrated at the thinner tone and lack of impact and contributing to its "kinder, gentler" feel relative to their previous albums.

On 4 July, the first solo single by a Beatle was released: Lennon's "Give Peace a Chance", credited to the Plastic Ono Band. The completion and mixing of "I Want You (She's So Heavy)" on 20 August was the last occasion on which all four Beatles were together in the same studio. On 8 September, while Starr was in hospital, the other band members met to discuss recording a new album. They considered a different approach to songwriting by ending the Lennon–McCartney pretence and having four compositions apiece from Lennon, McCartney and Harrison, with two from Starr and a lead single around Christmas. On 20 September, Lennon announced his departure to the rest of the group but agreed to withhold a public announcement to avoid undermining sales of the forthcoming album.

Released on 26 September, Abbey Road sold four million copies within three months and topped the UK charts for a total of seventeen weeks. Its second track, the ballad "Something", was issued as a single – the only Harrison composition that appeared as a Beatles A-side. Abbey Road received mixed reviews, although the medley met with general acclaim. Unterberger considers it "a fitting swan song for the group", containing "some of the greatest harmonies to be heard on any rock record". Musicologist and author Ian MacDonald calls the album "erratic and often hollow", despite the "semblance of unity and coherence" offered by the medley. Martin singled it out as his favourite Beatles album; Lennon said it was "competent" but had "no life in it".

For the still unfinished Get Back album, one last song, Harrison's "I Me Mine", was recorded on 3 January 1970. Lennon, in Denmark at the time, did not participate. In March, rejecting the work Johns had done on the project, now retitled Let It Be, Klein gave the session tapes to American producer Phil Spector, who had recently produced Lennon's solo single "Instant Karma!" In addition to remixing the material, Spector edited, spliced and overdubbed several of the recordings that had been intended as "live". McCartney was unhappy with the producer's approach and particularly dissatisfied with the lavish orchestration on "The Long and Winding Road", which involved a fourteen-voice choir and 36-piece instrumental ensemble. McCartney's demands that the alterations to the song be reverted were ignored, and he publicly announced his departure from the band on 10 April, a week before the release of his first self-titled solo album.

On 8 May 1970, Let It Be was released. Its accompanying single, "The Long and Winding Road", was the Beatles' last; it was released in the US, but not in the UK. The Let It Be documentary film followed later that month, and would win the 1970 Academy Award for Best Original Song Score. Sunday Telegraph critic Penelope Gilliatt called it "a very bad film and a touching one ... about the breaking apart of this reassuring, geometrically perfect, once apparently ageless family of siblings". Several reviewers stated that some of the performances in the film sounded better than their analogous album tracks. Describing Let It Be as the "only Beatles album to occasion negative, even hostile reviews", Unterberger calls it "on the whole underrated"; he singles out "some good moments of straight hard rock in 'I've Got a Feeling' and 'Dig a Pony'", and praises "Let It Be", "Get Back", and "the folky 'Two of Us', with John and Paul harmonising together".

McCartney filed suit for the dissolution of the Beatles' contractual partnership on 31 December 1970. Legal disputes continued long after their break-up, and the dissolution was not formalised until 29 December 1974, when Lennon signed the paperwork terminating the partnership while on vacation with his family at Walt Disney World Resort in Florida.

1970–present: After the break-up

1970s 

Lennon, McCartney, Harrison and Starr all released solo albums in 1970. Their solo records sometimes involved one or more of the others; Starr's Ringo (1973) was the only album to include compositions and performances by all four ex-Beatles, albeit on separate songs. With Starr's participation, Harrison staged the Concert for Bangladesh in New York City in August 1971. Other than an unreleased jam session in 1974, later bootlegged as A Toot and a Snore in '74, Lennon and McCartney never recorded together again.

Two double-LP sets of the Beatles' greatest hits, compiled by Klein, 1962–1966 and 1967–1970, were released in 1973, at first under the Apple Records imprint. Commonly known as the "Red Album" and "Blue Album", respectively, each has earned a Multi-Platinum certification in the US and a Platinum certification in the UK. Between 1976 and 1982, EMI/Capitol released a wave of compilation albums without input from the ex-Beatles, starting with the double-disc compilation Rock 'n' Roll Music. The only one to feature previously unreleased material was The Beatles at the Hollywood Bowl (1977); the first officially issued concert recordings by the group, it contained selections from two shows they played during their 1964 and 1965 US tours.

The music and enduring fame of the Beatles were commercially exploited in various other ways, again often outside their creative control. In April 1974, the musical John, Paul, George, Ringo ... and Bert, written by Willy Russell and featuring singer Barbara Dickson, opened in London. It included, with permission from Northern Songs, eleven Lennon-McCartney compositions and one by Harrison, "Here Comes the Sun". Displeased with the production's use of his song, Harrison withdrew his permission to use it. Later that year, the off-Broadway musical Sgt. Pepper's Lonely Hearts Club Band on the Road opened. All This and World War II (1976) was an unorthodox nonfiction film that combined newsreel footage with covers of Beatles songs by performers ranging from Elton John and Keith Moon to the London Symphony Orchestra. The Broadway musical Beatlemania, an unauthorised nostalgia revue, opened in early 1977 and proved popular, spinning off five separate touring productions. In 1979, the band sued the producers, settling for several million dollars in damages. Sgt. Pepper's Lonely Hearts Club Band (1978), a musical film starring the Bee Gees and Peter Frampton, was a commercial failure and an "artistic fiasco", according to Ingham.

Accompanying the wave of Beatles nostalgia and persistent reunion rumours in the US during the 1970s, several entrepreneurs made public offers to the Beatles for a reunion concert. Promoter Bill Sargent first offered the Beatles $10 million for a reunion concert in 1974. He raised his offer to $30 million in January 1976 and then to $50 million the following month. On 24 April 1976, during a broadcast of Saturday Night Live, producer Lorne Michaels jokingly offered the Beatles $3,000 to reunite on the show. Lennon and McCartney were watching the live broadcast at Lennon's apartment at the Dakota in New York, which was within driving distance of the NBC studio where the show was being broadcast. The former bandmates briefly entertained the idea of going to the studio and surprising Michaels by accepting his offer, but decided not to.

1980s 

In December 1980, Lennon was shot and killed outside his New York City apartment. Harrison rewrote the lyrics of his song "All Those Years Ago" in Lennon's honour. With Starr on drums and McCartney and his wife, Linda, contributing backing vocals, the song was released as a single in May 1981. McCartney's own tribute, "Here Today", appeared on his Tug of War album in April 1982.

In 1984, Starr co-starred in McCartney's film Give My Regards to Broad Street, and played with McCartney on several of the songs on the soundtrack. In 1987, Harrison's Cloud Nine album included "When We Was Fab", a song about the Beatlemania era.

When the Beatles' studio albums were released on CD by EMI and Apple Corps in 1987, their catalogue was standardised throughout the world, establishing a canon of the twelve original studio LPs as issued in the UK plus the US LP version of Magical Mystery Tour. All the remaining material from the singles and EPs that had not appeared on these thirteen studio albums was gathered on the two-volume compilation Past Masters (1988). Except for the Red and Blue albums, EMI deleted all its other Beatles compilations – including the Hollywood Bowl record – from its catalogue.

In 1988, the Beatles were inducted into the Rock and Roll Hall of Fame, their first year of eligibility. Harrison and Starr attended the ceremony with Lennon's widow, Yoko Ono, and his two sons, Julian and Sean. McCartney declined to attend, citing unresolved "business differences" that would make him "feel like a complete hypocrite waving and smiling with them at a fake reunion". The following year, EMI/Capitol settled a decade-long lawsuit filed by the band over royalties, clearing the way to commercially package previously unreleased material.

1990s 
Live at the BBC, the first official release of unissued Beatles performances in seventeen years, appeared in 1994. That same year McCartney, Harrison and Starr collaborated on the Anthology project. Anthology was the culmination of work begun in 1970, when Apple Corps director Neil Aspinall, their former road manager and personal assistant, had started to gather material for a documentary with the working title The Long and Winding Road. Documenting their history in the band's own words, the Anthology project included the release of several unissued Beatles recordings. McCartney, Harrison and Starr also added new instrumental and vocal parts to songs recorded as demos by Lennon in the late 1970s.

During 1995–96, the project yielded a television miniseries, an eight-volume video set, and three two-CD/three-LP box sets featuring artwork by Klaus Voormann. Two songs based on Lennon demos, "Free as a Bird" and "Real Love", were issued as new Beatles singles. The releases were commercially successful and the television series was viewed by an estimated 400 million people. In 1999, to coincide with the re-release of the 1968 film Yellow Submarine, an expanded soundtrack album, Yellow Submarine Songtrack, was issued.

2000s 
The Beatles' 1, a compilation album of the band's British and American number-one hits, was released on 13 November 2000. It became the fastest-selling album of all time, with 3.6 million sold in its first week and 13 million within a month. It topped albums charts in at least 28 countries. The compilation had sold 31 million copies globally by April 2009.

Harrison died from metastatic lung cancer in November 2001. McCartney and Starr were among the musicians who performed at the Concert for George, organised by Eric Clapton and Harrison's widow, Olivia. The tribute event took place at the Royal Albert Hall on the first anniversary of Harrison's death.

In 2003, Let It Be... Naked, a reconceived version of the Let It Be album, with McCartney supervising production, was released. One of the main differences from the Spector-produced version was the omission of the original string arrangements. It was a top-ten hit in both Britain and America. The US album configurations from 1964 to 1965 were released as box sets in 2004 and 2006; The Capitol Albums, Volume 1 and Volume 2 included both stereo and mono versions based on the mixes that were prepared for vinyl at the time of the music's original American release.

As a soundtrack for Cirque du Soleil's Las Vegas Beatles stage revue, Love, George Martin and his son Giles remixed and blended 130 of the band's recordings to create what Martin called "a way of re-living the whole Beatles musical lifespan in a very condensed period". The show premiered in June 2006, and the Love album was released that November. In April 2009, Starr performed three songs with McCartney at a benefit concert held at New York's Radio City Music Hall and organised by McCartney.

On 9 September 2009, the Beatles' entire back catalogue was reissued following an extensive digital remastering process that lasted four years. Stereo editions of all twelve original UK studio albums, along with Magical Mystery Tour and the Past Masters compilation, were released on compact disc both individually and as a box set. A second collection, The Beatles in Mono, included remastered versions of every Beatles album released in true mono along with the original 1965 stereo mixes of Help! and Rubber Soul (both of which Martin had remixed for the 1987 editions). The Beatles: Rock Band, a music video game in the Rock Band series, was issued on the same day. In December 2009, the band's catalogue was officially released in FLAC and MP3 format in a limited edition of 30,000 USB flash drives.

2010s 
Owing to a long-running royalty disagreement, the Beatles were among the last major artists to sign deals with online music services. Residual disagreement emanating from Apple Corps' dispute with Apple, Inc., iTunes' owners, over the use of the name "Apple" was also partly responsible for the delay, although in 2008, McCartney stated that the main obstacle to making the Beatles' catalogue available online was that EMI "want[s] something we're not prepared to give them". In 2010, the official canon of thirteen Beatles studio albums, Past Masters, and the "Red" and "Blue" greatest-hits albums were made available on iTunes.

In 2012, EMI's recorded music operations were sold to Universal Music Group. In order for Universal Music to acquire EMI, the European Union, for antitrust reasons, forced EMI to spin off assets including Parlophone. Universal was allowed to keep the Beatles' recorded music catalogue, managed by Capitol Records under its Capitol Music Group division. The entire original Beatles album catalogue was also reissued on vinyl in 2012; available either individually or as a box set.

In 2013, a second volume of BBC recordings, On Air – Live at the BBC Volume 2, was released. That December saw the release of another 59 Beatles recordings on iTunes. The set, titled The Beatles Bootleg Recordings 1963, had the opportunity to gain a 70-year copyright extension conditional on the songs being published at least once before the end of 2013. Apple Records released the recordings on 17 December to prevent them from going into the public domain and had them taken down from iTunes later that same day. Fan reactions to the release were mixed, with one blogger saying "the hardcore Beatles collectors who are trying to obtain everything will already have these."

On 26 January 2014, McCartney and Starr performed together at the 56th Annual Grammy Awards, held at the Staples Center in Los Angeles. The following day, The Night That Changed America: A Grammy Salute to The Beatles television special was taped in the Los Angeles Convention Center's West Hall. It aired on 9 February, the exact date of – and at the same time, and on the same network as – the original broadcast of the Beatles' first US television appearance on The Ed Sullivan Show, 50 years earlier. The special included performances of Beatles songs by current artists as well as by McCartney and Starr, archival footage, and interviews with the two surviving ex-Beatles carried out by David Letterman at the Ed Sullivan Theater. In December 2015, the Beatles released their catalogue for streaming on various streaming music services including Spotify and Apple Music.

In September 2016, the documentary film The Beatles: Eight Days a Week was released. Directed by Ron Howard, it chronicled the Beatles' career during their touring years from 1961 to 1966, from their performances in Liverpool's the Cavern Club in 1961 to their final concert in San Francisco in 1966. The film was released theatrically on 15 September in the UK and the US, and started streaming on Hulu on 17 September. It received several awards and nominations, including for Best Documentary at the 70th British Academy Film Awards and the Outstanding Documentary or Nonfiction Special at the 69th Primetime Creative Arts Emmy Awards. An expanded, remixed and remastered version of The Beatles at the Hollywood Bowl was released on 9 September, to coincide with the release of the film.

On 18 May 2017, Sirius XM Radio launched a 24/7 radio channel, The Beatles Channel. A week later, Sgt. Pepper's Lonely Hearts Club Band was reissued with new stereo mixes and unreleased material for the album's 50th anniversary. Similar box sets were released for The Beatles in November 2018, and Abbey Road in September 2019. On the first week of October 2019, Abbey Road returned to number one on the UK Albums Chart. The Beatles broke their own record for the album with the longest gap between topping the charts as Abbey Road hit the top spot 50 years after its original release.

2020s 
In November 2021, The Beatles: Get Back, a documentary directed by Peter Jackson using footage captured for the Let It Be film, was released on Disney+ as a three-part miniseries. A book also titled The Beatles: Get Back was released on 12 October, ahead of the documentary. A super deluxe version of the Let It Be album was released on 15 October. In January 2022, an album titled Get Back (Rooftop Performance), consisting of newly mixed audio of the Beatles' rooftop performance, was released on streaming services.

In October 2022, a special edition of Revolver was released, featuring unreleased demos, studio outtakes, the original mono mix and a new stereo remix using de-mixing technology developed by Peter Jackson's WingNuts Films.

Musical style and development 

In Icons of Rock: An Encyclopedia of the Legends Who Changed Music Forever, Scott Schinder and Andy Schwartz describe the Beatles' musical evolution:

In The Beatles as Musicians, Walter Everett describes Lennon and McCartney's contrasting motivations and approaches to composition: "McCartney may be said to have constantly developed – as a means to entertain – a focused musical talent with an ear for counterpoint and other aspects of craft in the demonstration of a universally agreed-upon common language that he did much to enrich. Conversely, Lennon's mature music is best appreciated as the daring product of a largely unconscious, searching but undisciplined artistic sensibility."

Ian MacDonald describes McCartney as "a natural melodist – a creator of tunes capable of existing apart from their harmony". His melody lines are characterised as primarily "vertical", employing wide, consonant intervals which express his "extrovert energy and optimism". Conversely, Lennon's "sedentary, ironic personality" is reflected in a "horizontal" approach featuring minimal, dissonant intervals and repetitive melodies which rely on their harmonic accompaniment for interest: "Basically a realist, he instinctively kept his melodies close to the rhythms and cadences of speech, colouring his lyrics with bluesy tone and harmony rather than creating tunes that made striking shapes of their own." MacDonald praises Harrison's lead guitar work for the role his "characterful lines and textural colourings" play in supporting Lennon and McCartney's parts, and describes Starr as "the father of modern pop/rock drumming".

Influences 
The Beatles' earliest influences include Elvis Presley, Carl Perkins, Little Richard and Chuck Berry. During the Beatles' co-residency with Little Richard at the Star-Club in Hamburg, from April to May 1962, he advised them on the proper technique for performing his songs. Of Presley, Lennon said, "Nothing really affected me until I heard Elvis. If there hadn't been Elvis, there would not have been the Beatles." Other early influences include Buddy Holly, Eddie Cochran, Roy Orbison and the Everly Brothers.

The Beatles continued to absorb influences long after their initial success, often finding new musical and lyrical avenues by listening to their contemporaries, including Bob Dylan, the Who, Frank Zappa, the Lovin' Spoonful, the Byrds and the Beach Boys, whose 1966 album Pet Sounds amazed and inspired McCartney. Referring to the Beach Boys' creative leader, Martin later stated: "No one made a greater impact on the Beatles than Brian [Wilson]." Ravi Shankar, with whom Harrison studied for six weeks in India in late 1966, had a significant effect on his musical development during the band's later years.

Genres 
Originating as a skiffle group, the Beatles quickly embraced 1950s rock and roll and helped pioneer the Merseybeat genre, and their repertoire ultimately expanded to include a broad variety of pop music. Reflecting the range of styles they explored, Lennon said of Beatles for Sale, "You could call our new one a Beatles country-and-western LP", while Gould credits Rubber Soul as "the instrument by which legions of folk-music enthusiasts were coaxed into the camp of pop".

Although the 1965 song "Yesterday" was not the first pop record to employ orchestral strings, it marked the group's first recorded use of classical music elements. Gould observes: "The more traditional sound of strings allowed for a fresh appreciation of their talent as composers by listeners who were otherwise allergic to the din of drums and electric guitars."

The band's stylistic range expanded in another direction with their 1966 B-side "Rain", described by Martin Strong as "the first overtly psychedelic Beatles record". Other psychedelic numbers followed, such as "Tomorrow Never Knows" (recorded before "Rain"), "Strawberry Fields Forever", "Lucy in the Sky with Diamonds" and "I Am the Walrus". The influence of Indian classical music was evident in Harrison's "The Inner Light", "Love You To" and "Within You Without You" – Gould describes the latter two as attempts "to replicate the raga form in miniature".

Innovation was the most striking feature of their creative evolution, according to music historian and pianist Michael Campbell: "'A Day in the Life' encapsulates the art and achievement of the Beatles as well as any single track can. It highlights key features of their music: the sound imagination, the persistence of tuneful melody, and the close coordination between words and music. It represents a new category of song – more sophisticated than pop ... and uniquely innovative. There literally had never before been a song – classical or vernacular – that had blended so many disparate elements so imaginatively." Philosophy professor Bruce Ellis Benson agrees: "the Beatles ... give us a wonderful example of how such far-ranging influences as Celtic music, rhythm and blues, and country and western could be put together in a new way."

Author Dominic Pedler describes the way they crossed musical styles: "Far from moving sequentially from one genre to another (as is sometimes conveniently suggested) the group maintained in parallel their mastery of the traditional, catchy chart hit while simultaneously forging rock and dabbling with a wide range of peripheral influences from country to vaudeville. One of these threads was their take on folk music, which would form such essential groundwork for their later collisions with Indian music and philosophy." As the personal relationships between the band members grew increasingly strained, their individual tastes became more apparent. The minimalistic cover artwork for the White Album contrasted with the complexity and diversity of its music, which encompassed Lennon's "Revolution 9" (whose musique concrète approach was influenced by Yoko Ono), Starr's country song "Don't Pass Me By", Harrison's rock ballad "While My Guitar Gently Weeps", and the "proto-metal roar" of McCartney's "Helter Skelter".

Contribution of George Martin 

George Martin's close involvement in his role as producer made him one of the leading candidates for the informal title of the "fifth Beatle". He applied his classical musical training in various ways, and functioned as "an informal music teacher" to the progressing songwriters, according to Gould. Martin suggested to a sceptical McCartney that the arrangement of "Yesterday" should feature a string quartet accompaniment, thereby introducing the Beatles to a "hitherto unsuspected world of classical instrumental colour", in MacDonald's description. Their creative development was also facilitated by Martin's willingness to experiment in response to their suggestions, such as adding "something baroque" to a particular recording. In addition to scoring orchestral arrangements for recordings, Martin often performed on them, playing instruments including piano, organ and brass.

Collaborating with Lennon and McCartney required Martin to adapt to their different approaches to songwriting and recording. MacDonald comments, "while [he] worked more naturally with the conventionally articulate McCartney, the challenge of catering to Lennon's intuitive approach generally spurred him to his more original arrangements, of which "Being for the Benefit of Mr. Kite!" is an outstanding example." Martin said of the two composers' distinct songwriting styles and his stabilising influence:

Harrison echoed Martin's description of his stabilising role: "I think we just grew through those years together, him as the straight man and us as the loonies; but he was always there for us to interpret our madness – we used to be slightly avant-garde on certain days of the week, and he would be there as the anchor person, to communicate that through the engineers and on to the tape."

In the studio 

Making innovative use of technology while expanding the possibilities of recorded music, the Beatles urged experimentation by Martin and his recording engineers. Seeking ways to put chance occurrences to creative use, accidental guitar feedback, a resonating glass bottle, a tape loaded the wrong way round so that it played backwards – any of these might be incorporated into their music. Their desire to create new sounds on every new recording, combined with Martin's arranging abilities and the studio expertise of EMI staff engineers Norman Smith, Ken Townsend and Geoff Emerick, all contributed significantly to their records from Rubber Soul and, especially, Revolver onwards.

Along with innovative studio techniques such as sound effects, unconventional microphone placements, tape loops, double tracking and vari-speed recording, the Beatles augmented their songs with instruments that were unconventional in rock music at the time. These included string and brass ensembles as well as Indian instruments such as the sitar in "Norwegian Wood" and the swarmandal in "Strawberry Fields Forever". They also used novel electronic instruments such as the Mellotron, with which McCartney supplied the flute voices on the "Strawberry Fields Forever" intro, and the clavioline, an electronic keyboard that created the unusual oboe-like sound on "Baby, You're a Rich Man".

Legacy 

Former Rolling Stone associate editor Robert Greenfield compared the Beatles to Picasso, as "artists who broke through the constraints of their time period to come up with something that was unique and original ... [I]n the form of popular music, no one will ever be more revolutionary, more creative and more distinctive ..." The British poet Philip Larkin described their work as "an enchanting and intoxicating hybrid of Negro rock-and-roll with their own adolescent romanticism", and "the first advance in popular music since the War".

The Beatles' 1964 arrival in the US is credited with initiating the album era; the music historian Joel Whitburn says that LP sales soon "exploded and eventually outpaced the sales and releases of singles" in the music industry. They not only sparked the British Invasion of the US, they became a globally influential phenomenon as well. From the 1920s, the US had dominated popular entertainment culture throughout much of the world, via Hollywood films, jazz, the music of Broadway and Tin Pan Alley and, later, the rock and roll that first emerged in Memphis, Tennessee. The Beatles are regarded as British cultural icons, with young adults from abroad naming the band among a group of people whom they most associated with UK culture.

Their musical innovations and commercial success inspired musicians worldwide. Many artists have acknowledged the Beatles' influence and enjoyed chart success with covers of their songs. On radio, their arrival marked the beginning of a new era; in 1968 the programme director of New York's WABC radio station forbade his DJs from playing any "pre-Beatles" music, marking the defining line of what would be considered oldies on American radio. They helped to redefine the album as something more than just a few hits padded out with "filler", and they were primary innovators of the modern music video. The Shea Stadium show with which they opened their 1965 North American tour attracted an estimated 55,600 people, then the largest audience in concert history; Spitz describes the event as a "major breakthrough ... a giant step toward reshaping the concert business". Emulation of their clothing and especially their hairstyles, which became a mark of rebellion, had a global impact on fashion.

According to Gould, the Beatles changed the way people listened to popular music and experienced its role in their lives. From what began as the Beatlemania fad, the group's popularity grew into what was seen as an embodiment of sociocultural movements of the decade. As icons of the 1960s counterculture, Gould continues, they became a catalyst for bohemianism and activism in various social and political arenas, fuelling movements such as women's liberation, gay liberation and environmentalism. According to Peter Lavezzoli, after the "more popular than Jesus" controversy in 1966, the Beatles felt considerable pressure to say the right things and "began a concerted effort to spread a message of wisdom and higher consciousness".

Other commentators such as Mikal Gilmore and Todd Leopold have traced the inception of their socio-cultural impact earlier, interpreting even the Beatlemania period, particularly on their first visit to the US, as a key moment in the development of generational awareness. Referring to their appearance on the Ed Sullivan Show Leopold states: "In many ways, the Sullivan appearance marked the beginning of a cultural revolution ... The Beatles were like aliens dropped into the United States of 1964." According to Gilmore:

Established in 2009, Global Beatles Day is an annual holiday on 25 June each year that honours and celebrates the ideals of the Beatles. The date was chosen to commemorate the date the group participated in the BBC programme Our World in 1967, performing "All You Need Is Love" broadcast to an international audience.

Awards and achievements 

In 1965, Queen Elizabeth II appointed Lennon, McCartney, Harrison and Starr Members of the Order of the British Empire (MBE). The Beatles won the 1971 Academy Award for Best Original Song Score for the film Let It Be (1970). The recipients of seven Grammy Awards and fifteen Ivor Novello Awards, the Beatles have six Diamond albums, as well as 20 Multi-Platinum albums, 16 Platinum albums and six Gold albums in the US. In the UK, the Beatles have four Multi-Platinum albums, four Platinum albums, eight Gold albums and one Silver album. They were inducted into the Rock and Roll Hall of Fame in 1988.

The best-selling band in history, the Beatles have sold more than 600 million units . From 1991 to 2009 The Beatles have sold 57 million albums in United States according to Nielsen Soundscan. They have had more number-one albums on the UK charts, fifteen, and sold more singles in the UK, 21.9 million, than any other act. In 2004, Rolling Stone ranked the Beatles as the most significant and influential rock music artists of the last 50 years. They ranked number one on Billboard magazine's list of the all-time most successful Hot 100 artists, released in 2008 to celebrate the US singles chart's 50th anniversary. , they hold the record for most number-one hits on the Billboard Hot 100, with twenty. The Recording Industry Association of America certifies that the Beatles have sold 183 million units in the US, more than any other artist. They were collectively included in Time magazine's compilation of the 20th century's 100 most influential people. In 2014, they received the Grammy Lifetime Achievement Award.

On 16 January each year, beginning in 2001, people celebrate World Beatles Day under UNESCO. This date has direct relation to the opening of the Cavern Club in 1957. In 2007, the Beatles became the first band to feature on a series of UK postage stamps issued by the Royal Mail. Earlier in 1999, the United States Postal Service issued a stamp dedicated to the Beatles and Yellow Submarine.

Personnel 

Principal members
 John Lennon – vocals, guitars, keyboards, harmonica, bass (1960–1969; died 1980)
 Paul McCartney – vocals, bass, guitars, keyboards, drums (1960–1970)
 George Harrison – guitars, vocals, sitar, keyboards, bass (1960–1970; died 2001)
 Ringo Starr – drums, percussion, vocals (1962–1970)

Early members
 Pete Best – drums, vocals (1960–1962)
 Stuart Sutcliffe – bass, vocals (1960–1961; died 1962)
 Chas Newby – bass (1960–1961)
 Norman Chapman – drums (1960; died 1995)
 Tommy Moore – drums (1960; died 1981)

Touring musician
 Jimmie Nicol – drums (1964)

Timeline

Discography 

The Beatles have a core catalogue consisting of 13 studio albums and one compilation.

 Please Please Me (1963)
 With the Beatles (1963)
 A Hard Day's Night (1964)
 Beatles for Sale (1964)
 Help! (1965)
 Rubber Soul (1965)
 Revolver (1966)
 Sgt. Pepper's Lonely Hearts Club Band (1967)
 Magical Mystery Tour (1967)
 The Beatles (1968) ("The White Album")
 Yellow Submarine (1969)
 Abbey Road (1969)
 Let It Be (1970)
 Past Masters (1988, compilation)

Song catalogue 
Through 1969, the Beatles' catalogue was published almost exclusively by Northern Songs Ltd, a company formed in February 1963 by music publisher Dick James specifically for Lennon and McCartney, though it later acquired songs by other artists. The company was organised with James and his partner, Emmanuel Silver, owning a controlling interest, variously described as 51% or 50% plus one share. McCartney had 20%. Reports again vary concerning Lennon's portion – 19 or 20% – and Brian Epstein's – 9 or 10% – which he received in lieu of a 25% band management fee. In 1965, the company went public. Five million shares were created, of which the original principals retained 3.75 million. James and Silver each received 937,500 shares (18.75% of 5 million); Lennon and McCartney each received 750,000 shares (15%); and Epstein's management company, NEMS Enterprises, received 375,000 shares (7.5%). Of the 1.25 million shares put up for sale, Harrison and Starr each acquired 40,000. At the time of the stock offering, Lennon and McCartney renewed their three-year publishing contracts, binding them to Northern Songs until 1973.

Harrison created Harrisongs to represent his Beatles compositions, but signed a three-year contract with Northern Songs that gave it the copyright to his work through March 1968, which included "Taxman" and "Within You Without You". The songs on which Starr received co-writing credit before 1968, such as "What Goes On" and "Flying", were also Northern Songs copyrights. Harrison did not renew his contract with Northern Songs when it ended, signing instead with Apple Publishing while retaining the copyright to his work from that point on. Harrison thus owns the rights to his later Beatles songs such as "While My Guitar Gently Weeps" and "Something". That year, as well, Starr created Startling Music, which holds the rights to his Beatles compositions, "Don't Pass Me By" and "Octopus's Garden".

In March 1969, James arranged to sell his and his partner's shares of Northern Songs to the British broadcasting company Associated Television (ATV), founded by impresario Lew Grade, without first informing the Beatles. The band then made a bid to gain a controlling interest by attempting to work out a deal with a consortium of London brokerage firms that had accumulated a 14% holding. The deal collapsed over the objections of Lennon, who declared, "I'm sick of being fucked about by men in suits sitting on their fat arses in the City." By the end of May, ATV had acquired a majority stake in Northern Songs, controlling nearly the entire Lennon–McCartney catalogue, as well as any future material until 1973. In frustration, Lennon and McCartney sold their shares to ATV in late October 1969.

In 1981, financial losses by ATV's parent company, Associated Communications Corporation (ACC), led it to attempt to sell its music division. According to authors Brian Southall and Rupert Perry, Grade contacted McCartney, offering ATV Music and Northern Songs for $30 million. According to an account McCartney gave in 1995, he met with Grade and explained he was interested solely in the Northern Songs catalogue if Grade were ever willing to "separate off" that portion of ATV Music. Soon afterwards, Grade offered to sell him Northern Songs for £20 million, giving the ex-Beatle "a week or so" to decide. By McCartney's account, he and Ono countered with a £5 million bid that was rejected. According to reports at the time, Grade refused to separate Northern Songs and turned down an offer of £21–25 million from McCartney and Ono for Northern Songs. In 1982, ACC was acquired in a takeover by Australian business magnate Robert Holmes à Court for £60 million.

In 1985, Michael Jackson purchased ATV for a reported $47.5 million. The acquisition gave him control over the publishing rights to more than 200 Beatles songs, as well as 40,000 other copyrights. In 1995, in a deal that earned him a reported $110 million, Jackson merged his music publishing business with Sony, creating a new company, Sony/ATV Music Publishing, in which he held a 50% stake. The merger made the new company, then valued at over half a billion dollars, the third-largest music publisher in the world. In 2016, Sony acquired Jackson's share of Sony/ATV from the Jackson estate for $750 million.

Despite the lack of publishing rights to most of their songs, Lennon's estate and McCartney continue to receive their respective shares of the writers' royalties, which together are 33% of total commercial proceeds in the US and which vary elsewhere around the world between 50 and 55%. Two of Lennon and McCartney's earliest songs – "Love Me Do" and "P.S. I Love You" – were published by an EMI subsidiary, Ardmore & Beechwood, before they signed with James. McCartney acquired their publishing rights from Ardmore in 1978, and they are the only two Beatles songs owned by McCartney's company MPL Communications. On 18 January 2017, McCartney filed a suit in the United States district court against Sony/ATV Music Publishing seeking to reclaim ownership of his share of the Lennon–McCartney song catalogue beginning in 2018. Under US copyright law, for works published before 1978 the author can reclaim copyrights assigned to a publisher after 56 years. McCartney and Sony agreed to a confidential settlement in June 2017.

Selected filmography

Fictionalised
 A Hard Day's Night (1964)
 Help! (1965)
 Magical Mystery Tour (1967)
 Yellow Submarine (1968) (brief cameo)

Documentaries and filmed performances
 The Beatles at Shea Stadium (1966)
 Let It Be (1970)
 The Compleat Beatles (1982)
 It Was Twenty Years Ago Today (1987) (about Sgt. Pepper)
 The Beatles Anthology (1995)
 The Beatles: 1+ (2015) (collection of digitally restored music videos)
 The Beatles: Eight Days a Week (2016) (about Beatlemania and touring years)
 The Beatles: Get Back (2021)

Concert tours

Headlining
 1963 UK tours (winter–autumn)
 Autumn 1963 Sweden tour
 Winter 1964 North American tour
 Spring 1964 UK tour
 1964 world tour
 1964 North American tour
 1965 European tour
 1965 US tour
 1965 UK tour
 1966 tour of Germany, Japan and the Philippines
 1966 US tour

Co-headlining
 Winter 1963 Helen Shapiro Tour
 Spring 1963 Tommy Roe/Chris Montez UK tour
 Roy Orbison/The Beatles Tour

See also
 Grammy Award records – Most Grammys won by a group

Notes

References

Citations

Sources

Further reading

External links 

 
 The Beatles on the Internet Archive
 
 
 The Beatles – FBI file
 

 
1960 establishments in England
1970 disestablishments in England
Apple Corps
Apple Records artists
Atco Records artists
Beat groups
Brit Award winners
British Invasion artists
Capitol Records artists
English pop music groups
English psychedelic rock music groups
English rock music groups
Grammy Lifetime Achievement Award winners
Musical groups established in 1960
Musical groups disestablished in 1970
Musical groups from Liverpool
Musical quartets
Parlophone artists
Proto-prog musicians
Psychedelic pop music groups
Swan Records artists
United Artists Records artists
Vee-Jay Records artists
World Music Awards winners
World record holders